Spring Hill is an unincorporated community in Conecuh County, Alabama, United States.

References

Unincorporated communities in Conecuh County, Alabama
Unincorporated communities in Alabama